Jong-soo  is a Korean masculine given name. Its meaning differs based on the hanja used to write each syllable of the name. There are 19 hanja with the reading "jong" and 67 hanja with the reading "soo" on the South Korean government's official list of hanja which may be registered for use in given names. According to South Korean government data, it was the second most-popular name for newborn boys in Korea under Japanese rule in 1940.

People with this name include:
Jong Soo Park (born 1941), South Korean-born Canadian taekwondo master
Augustinus Kim Jong-soo (born 1956), South Korean Roman Catholic priest
Chung Jong-soo (born 1961), South Korean former international footballer 
Lee Jong-soo (born 1976), South Korean actor
Ko Jong-soo (born 1978), South Korean football coach 
Kim Jong-soo (born 1986), South Korean footballer

See also
List of Korean given names

References

Korean masculine given names